Jennifer Boykin is an engineer, the first woman president of Newport News Shipbuilding, and the vice president of Huntington Ingalls Industries, which is located in Newport News, Virginia.

Biography

Early life
Boykin's father's parents are both from Puerto Rico. She was born in California and grew up in St. Louis, Missouri. Jennifer was a tomboy and was the first girl to play baseball with the boys in her division.

Education
She received her Bachelor of Science degree in Marine Engineering from the United States Merchant Marine Academy in Kings Point, New York.

She earned her Master of Science degree in Engineering Management from George Washington University in Washington, D.C.

Career
Boykin first worked as an engineer in the nuclear engineering division at Newport News Shipbuilding before moving through the ranks and eventually becoming president of the company. She is the first woman president of Newport News Shipbuilding, the first in over 133 years of operation. She runs the largest shipbuilding operations in the United States, including the only one that builds nuclear-powered aircraft carriers  and one of two that makes nuclear-powered submarines. The shipyard is currently working on Gerald R. Ford-class aircraft carriers. The shipyard employs over 22,000 personnel.

Family life
She has been married to Blake Boykin for more than 30 years, and has one daughter that also works at Newport News Shipbuilding.

References

United States Merchant Marine Academy alumni
George Washington University alumni
American women engineers
Living people
Year of birth missing (living people)